Robert Scott Pierre (born October 17, 1992) is a Contemporary Christian musician, songwriter and guitarist from Orlando, Florida. His debut album, Inside Out, was released on November 7, 2006 and produced by Al Denson. Pierre's second album, titled Identity, was originally released in November 2008; it was re-released in April 2009 with three additional tracks, including the radio single "Jesus". His next album, I'm All In was released on July 18, 2011 and, on October 18, 2017, his fourth album, Nothing Without You, was released by Thinkaboutit Records.

Childhood
He is the son of Karla and Scott Pierre, and the grandson of Robert Van Kampen.

Pierre grew up in Windermere, Florida and attended school at the First Academy, a school run by the First Baptist Church of Orlando.

Career

Pierre's career began as a boy soprano with a voice that the Orlando Sentinel described as "reminiscent of Michael Jackson's from the Jackson Five era."

In 2010 he performed together with Sidewalk Prophets and Revive as the warm-up acts on a Winter Jam tour.

Discography

Studio albums 
2006: Inside Out (Beatmark Records)
2008: Identity – re-released in 2009 (Thinkaboutit Records)
2011: I'm All In (Thinkaboutit Records)
2017: Nothing Without You (Thinkaboutit Records)

Singles 
 "Eternal"
 "Possible"
 "Jesus"
 "Stranger in This Land"

References

External links 
 

American performers of Christian music
Living people
1992 births
21st-century American singers
21st-century American male singers